Chandra Mayor (born in 1973), is a Canadian poet and novelist whose writings explore  urban and alternative cultures, among others. She lives in Winnipeg, Manitoba.

Publishing career 
Mayor's writing has appeared in several anthologies, including Interruptions: 30 Women Tell the Truth about Motherhood, Breathing Fire 2: Canada's New Poets, and Post-Prairie. Her first book, August Witch, a book of poetry, was short-listed for four Manitoba Book Awards and won the Eileen McTavish Sykes Award for Best First Book. She received the 2004 John Hirsch Award for Most Promising Writer, and the following year she followed that up with her novel, Cherry, which won the Carol Shields Winnipeg Book Award. Mayor, who is openly lesbian, was shortlisted for a 2008 CBC Literary Award for the title story from her most recent book, All the Pretty Girls (Conundrum Press), a collection of short stories. All the Pretty Girls won the 2009 Lambda Award for Best Lesbian Fiction.

Awards
Winner, Lambda Award for Best Lesbian Fiction, 2009
Winner, Carol Shields Winnipeg Book Award, 2005
Winner, John Hirsch Award for the Most Promising Manitoba Writer, 2004
Winner, Eileen McTavish Sykes Award for Best First Book, 2003

Quotes
Chandra Mayor on writing:

"Telling the truth is harder than telling lies. Which makes writing hard work. But it's also what makes it resonate, makes it mean something to the person who reads it. Writing is exhibitionism. Writing is dragging something out of you, kicking and screaming. Writing is also craft, which is only achieved through pure drudgery. At the end of it all, someone says, 'you spoke to me,' and it's all worth it."

References

External links
 Winnipeg International Writers Festival Biography

21st-century Canadian poets
Canadian women poets
Canadian lesbian writers
1973 births
Living people
Lambda Literary Award for Lesbian Fiction winners
Writers from Winnipeg
Canadian LGBT poets
21st-century Canadian women writers
21st-century Canadian LGBT people